The Essex County Veterans Courthouse is located in Newark, New Jersey. It was built in 1904 and was added to the National Register of Historic Places on June 26, 1975.

The building, designed by Cass Gilbert, has a four-story rotunda topped with a Tiffany skylight. It features artwork from some of the most well known artists of the American Renaissance period including Seated Lincoln by Gutzon Borglum.

The annex was completed the 1960s. Jack Murphy of Fava Associates was the lead architect on the annex project. The courthouse complex was further expanded in 2021 to include the Martin Luther King, Jr. Judicial Building.

See also
County courthouses in New Jersey
Richard J. Hughes Justice Complex
Federal courthouses in New Jersey
National Register of Historic Places listings in Essex County, New Jersey
Seated Lincoln
Statue of Martin Luther King Jr. (Newark)

References

External links

Buildings and structures in Newark, New Jersey
Cass Gilbert buildings
County courthouses in New Jersey
Courthouses on the National Register of Historic Places in New Jersey
Government buildings completed in 1904
National Register of Historic Places in Newark, New Jersey
New Jersey Register of Historic Places
Renaissance Revival architecture in New Jersey